The Black Opal Stakes is a Canberra Racing Club Group 3 Thoroughbred horse race, for two-year-olds, at set weights, over a distance of 1200 metres, held annually at Canberra Racecourse in Canberra, Australia in March. Total prize money for the race is A$200,000.

History

Grade

 1975–1978 - Principal Race
 1979–1986 -  Group 3
 1987–1998 -  Group 2
 1999–2005 -  Group 3
 2006–2014 - Listed Race
 2015 onwards - Group 3

Records
Catbird (1999) is the only two-year-old to have taken out the Black Opal Stakes & Golden Slipper Stakes double since its inception.
Race record is held by St Covet in 1994 with the time of 1.09.6.

Winners

 2023 - Autumn Ballet
 2022 - Queen Of The Ball
 2021 - Kalashnikov
 2020 - Barbaric
 2019 - Pin Sec
 2018 - Encryption
 2017 - Trapeze Artist
 2016 - Defcon
 2015 - Takedown
 2014 - Lucky Raquie
 2013 - Criterion
 2012 - Epaulette 
 2011 - You're Canny 
 2010 - Decision Time 
 2009 - Delago Bolt 
 2008 - Sarthemare 
 2007 - †race not held
 2006 - Down The Wicket 
 2005 - Al Samer
 2004 - Uber
 2003 - Handsome Ransom
 2002 - Planchet
 2001 - Coral Salute
 2000 - Pembleton
 1999 - Catbird
 1998 - Speed Week
 1997 - Fraud
 1996 - Paint
 1995 - Zadok
 1994 - St. Covet
 1993 - Danger
 1992 - Clan O'Sullivan
 1991 - Sormani
 1990 - Unspoken Word
 1989 - Marks Gain
 1988 - Comely Girl
 1987 - Maizcay
 1986 - Just Blooming
 1985 - New Atlantis
 1984 - Spirit Of Kingston
 1983 - Brummel Who
 1982 - Beans   
 1981 - Chinese Treasure 
 1980 - Nasau      
 1979 - Star Grace    
 1978 - Gold Mosaic   
 1977 - Blazing Saddles   
 1976 - Bianca  
 1975 - Silver Shadow  
 1974 - Royal Brittania  
 1973 - Rich Reward   

† Canberra's racetrack, Thoroughbred Park was under redevelopment.

See also
 List of Australian Group races
 Group races

External links 
First three placegetters Black Opal Stakes

References

Horse races in Australia